Crooked Creek is a stream in Crawford and Dent counties in the U.S. state of Missouri. It is a tributary of the Meramec River.

The stream flows generally northwest crossing under Missouri Route TT just east of Sligo and enters Crawford County. The stream crosses under Missouri Route 19 4.5 miles southwest of Cherryville.

Crooked Creek was so named on account of its meandering course.

See also
List of rivers of Missouri

References

Rivers of Crawford County, Missouri
Rivers of Dent County, Missouri
Rivers of Missouri
Tributaries of the Meramec River